Zhu Dunfa (28 December 1927 – 21 July 2021) was a general (shangjiang) of the People's Liberation Army (PLA). He was a delegate to the 6th and 7th National People's Congress, and a member of the 14th Central Committee of the Chinese Communist Party.

Biography
Zhu was born in Pei County, Jiangsu, on 28 December 1927. He enlisted in the Eighth Route Army in 1939, and joined the Chinese Communist Party (CCP) in 1945.

In 1953, he was assigned North Korea with the 16th Group Army and fought under Peng Dehuai at the Korean War. He returned to China in 1958. In 1985, he was made deputy commander of Shenyang Military Region. In April 1990, he was promoted to commander of Guangzhou Military Region, he remained in that position until October 1992, when he was commissioned as president of PLA National Defence University.

On 21 July 2021, he died from an illness in Beijing, at the age of 93.

He was promoted to the rank of lieutenant general (zhongjiang) in 1988 and general (shangjiang) in 1993.

References

1927 births
2021 deaths
People from Pei County
People's Liberation Army generals from Jiangsu
People's Republic of China politicians from Jiangsu
Chinese Communist Party politicians from Jiangsu
Commanders of the Guangzhou Military Region
Delegates to the 6th National People's Congress
Delegates to the 7th National People's Congress
Members of the 14th Central Committee of the Chinese Communist Party